Trapped in the Saturday Matinee is a collection of short stories written by American author Joe R. Lansdale. In the introduction Mr. Lansdale states "This collection gathers together some early work, which I like, and it also contains stories, for one reason or another, missed their audience. There are also newer material that I treasure, some that has never been gathered under one roof, and there are others written specifically for this volume."

"I love this collection. It’s a mixture of nostalgia and maturity, the reworking of others’ work and the discovery of my own voice.
I like to write introductions as a way of inviting you into my house of stories. But now I’ll leave you to it. Just wander from room to room, and take your time. While you’re here, make yourself at home. But please . . . try not to break the furniture on your way out."

Editions
This book is published as a limited edition and as a trade hardcover by PS Publishing in the U.K. and is available in The U.S. through Subterranean Press.

Table of contents
Introduction: Good Ju-Ju
 The Junkyard
 The Valley of the Swastika
 Duck Footed
 Dog
 It Washed Up
 Way Down There
 A Hard-On for Horror: Low Budget Excitement
 Edgar Allan Poe's Shadow and The Aluminum Chair Factory Collide: One Survivor, Weak in the Knees with Pen and Paper
 Once Upon a time
 The Drunken Moon
 Christmas Monkey
 I tell You It's Love
 The White Rabbit
 Everybody Plays The fool  
 Pentecostal Punk Rock
 Jiving with Shadows and Dragons and Long dark Trains
 Dirt Devils
 Trapped In The Saturday Matinee
 The Devil's Pants
 Family
 The Hunt: Before And The Aftermath

References

External links
 Authors Official website
 PS Publishing Website
 Subterranean Press Website

2012 short story collections
Horror short story collections
Short story collections by Joe R. Lansdale
PS Publishing books